The Ho Chi Minh sandals (Vietnamese dép lốp "tire sandal") are a form of sandal made from discarded tires. Along with the khăn rằn scarf, they were a distinctive clothing of Viet Cong soldiers. These shoes were often called "Ho Chi Minh sandals" or "Ho Chis" by Americans.

References

Vietnamese words and phrases
American English idioms
Vietnamese clothing
Sandals
Tires